The 1997–97 Atlético Morelia season was the 82nd season in the football club's history and the 15th consecutive season in the top flight of Mexican football.

Coaching staff

Players

Squad information

Players and squad numbers last updated on 31 January 2019.Note: Flags indicate national team as has been defined under FIFA eligibility rules. Players may hold more than one non-FIFA nationality.

Competitions

Overview

Torneo Invierno

League table

Results summary

Torneo Verano

League table

Results summary

Statistics

Goals

Hat-tricks

Own goals

Clean sheets

References

Atlético Morelia seasons
1996–97 Mexican Primera División season
1996–97 in Mexican football